Marcin Grabowski (born 21 May 2000) is a Polish professional footballer who plays as a left-back for Bruk-Bet Termalica Nieciecza.

Career

Club career
On 22 February 2018 Wisła Kraków confirmed, that Grabowski would join the club from the 2018-19 season. Grabowski only played eight league games in his first season. In the second season, he made two appearances, before he was loaned out to Bruk-Bet Termalica Nieciecza on 15 January 2020, for the rest of the season. He was bought free by the club at the end of the season.

References

External links

2000 births
Living people
Polish footballers
Association football defenders
Poland youth international footballers
Poland under-21 international footballers
Lech Poznań II players
Lech Poznań players
Wisła Kraków players
Bruk-Bet Termalica Nieciecza players
Ekstraklasa players
I liga players
III liga players